The 1990 North Star Conference women's basketball tournament was held at the ? in DeKalb, Illinois. The tournament began on March 8, 1990, and ended on March 10, 1990. Northern Illinois earned a first-round bye by finishing in first place during the regular season.

North Star Conference standings

1990 North Star Conference Tournament
First round Bye Northern Illinois
First round March 8, 1990 Green Bay 68, Cleveland State 67
First round March 8, 1990 DePaul 83, Illinois Chicago 45
First round March 8, 1990 Valparaiso 81, Akron 80
Semifinals March 9, 1990 DePaul 69, Green Bay 59
Semifinals March 9, 1990 @Northern Illinois 102, Valparaiso 79
Championship: March 10, 1990 @Northern Illinois, 97 DePaul 85

References

North Star
North Star Conference